This is a timeline documenting events of Jazz in the year 1975.

Events

March
 21 – The 2nd Vossajazz started in Voss, Norway (March 21 – 23).

May
 16 – The 4th Moers Festival started in Moers, Germany (May 16 – 19).
 21 – The 3rd Nattjazz started in Bergen, Norway (May 21 – June 4).

June
 27 – The 22nd Newport Jazz Festival started in Newport, Rhode Island (June 27 – July 6).

July
 3 – The 9th Montreux Jazz Festival started in Montreux, Switzerland (July 3 – 20).

September
 19 – The 18th Monterey Jazz Festival started in Monterey, California (September 19 – 21).

Album releases

Keith Jarrett: The Köln Concert
Revolutionary Ensemble: The People's Republic
Miles Davis: Agharta
Evan Parker: Saxophone Solos
Leroy Jenkins: For Players Only
Air: Air Song
Oliver Lake: Heavy Spirits
Kenny Wheeler: Gnu High
Om: Kirikuki
Terje Rypdal: Odyssey
Steve Lacy: Dreams
Anthony Braxton: Five Pieces
Don Pullen: Solo Piano Album
Dexter Gordon: Bouncin' with Dex
Michael Mantler: Michael Mantler – Carla Bley
Sonny Sharrock: Paradise
Dudu Pukwana: Diamond Express
George Finola: No Words, Just George
Kenny Barron: Lucifer
Frank Lowe: The Flam
John Surman: S.O.S.
Don Pullen: Healing Force
Julius Hemphill: Coon Bid'ness
Gateway Trio: Gateway
Collin Walcott: Cloud Dance
Don Moye: Sun Percussion
Martial Solal: Nothing But Piano
Eberhard Weber: Yellow Fields
Don Pullen: Five to Go
Charles Tolliver: Impact
Lol Coxhill: Welfare State
David Liebman: Forgotten Fantasies
Joe McPhee: The Willisau Concert
Yōsuke Yamashita: Chiasma
Michael Mantler: The Hapless Child
Dollar Brand: Soweto
Don Pullen: Capricorn Rising
Stanley Clarke: Journey to Love
Enrico Rava: The Pilgrim and the Stars
The Manhattan Transfer: The Manhattan Transfer

Deaths

 January
 3 – René Thomas, Belgian guitarist (born 1927).

 February
 5 – Åke Persson, Swedish trombonist (born 1932).

 March
 4 – Cornel Chiriac, Romanian radio producer, record producer, and drummer (born 1941).
 15 – Sandy Brown, Scottish clarinetist and band leader (born 1929).
 16 – T-Bone Walker, American guitarist, singer, songwriter and multi-instrumentalist (born 1910).
 27 – Pete Clarke, British saxophonist and clarinetist (died 1975).

 April
 12 – Josephine Baker, French singer, entertainer, activist, and Resistance agent (born 1906).

 May
 11 – Benny Harris, American trumpeter and composer (born 1919).
 13 – Tubby Hall, American drummer (born 1895).
 June
 18 – Earl Washington, American pianist (born 1921).

 July
 14 – Zutty Singleton, American drummer (born 1898).
 16 – Pippo Starnazza, Italian singer and actor (born 1909).
 21 – Theodore Carpenter, American trumpet player, singer, and band leader (born 1898).

 August
 8 – Cannonball Adderley, American alto saxophonist (born 1928).

 October
 28 – Oliver Nelson, American saxophonist, clarinetist, arranger, composer, and bandleader (born 1932).

 November
 14 – Artemi Ayvazyan, Soviet-Armenian composer, conductor, and founder of the Armenian State Jazz Orchestra (born 1902).

 December
 11 – Lee Wiley, American singer (born 1908).
 14 – Mongezi Feza, South African trumpeter and flautist (born 1945).
 17
 Fess Williams, American clarinetist and alto saxophonist (born 1894).
 Stan Wrightsman, American pianist (born 1910).

 Unknown date
 Trevor Koehler, American saxophonist (born 1935).

Births

 January
 17 – Squarepusher or Tom Jenkinson, English electronic musician and composer.
 18 – Géraldine Laurent, French alto saxophonist.
 21 – Jason Moran, American pianist and composer.

 February
 7 – Kellylee Evans, Canadian singer.

 March
 4 – Mats Eilertsen, Norwegian upright bassist and composer, Food and Dingobats.
 9 – Øyvind Storesund, Norwegian upright bassist, Cloroform and Kaizers Orchestra.
 10 – Håvard Wiik, Norwegian pianist and composer, Atomic.
 14 – Gianluca Petrella, Italian trombonist.
 17 – Jairzinho Oliveira, Brazilian singer, songwriter, and composer.
 18 – Sondre Meisfjord, Norwegian bassist, cellist, and composer, Come Shine.
 22 – Steinar Raknes, Norwegian upright bassist, Urban Connection and The Core.
 25 – David Braid, Canadian pianist and composer.
 27 – Katja Toivola, Finnish trombonist.
 28 – Orrin Evans, American pianist.

 April
 12 – Lars Andreas Haug, Norwegian tubist.
 13 – Jan Harbeck, Danish saxophonist and composer.
 23
 Helge Lien, Norwegian pianist, composer, and band leader.
 Rolf-Erik Nystrøm, Norwegian saxophonist and composer.
 27
 Fabrizio Sotti, Italian guitarist, composer, songwriter, and producer.
 Jozef Dumoulin, Belgian keyboarder and composer.

 May
 1 – Aslak Hartberg, Norwegian rapper and bassist.
 7 – Gunhild Carling, Swedish trombonist and multi-instrumentalist.
 15 – Frode Haltli, Norwegian accordionist.

 June
 2 – Gisle Torvik, Norwegian guitarist, composer, and band leader.
 16 – Jannike Kruse, Norwegian singer, artist and actor.

 July
 11 – Chris Gall, German pianist and composer.
 22 – Erik Johannessen, Norwegian trombonist and composer, Jaga Jazzist and Trondheim Jazz Orchestra.
 23 – Céline Bonacina, French saxophonist, composer, and bandleader.

 August
 1 – Håkon Mjåset Johansen, Norwegian drummer and composer, Trondheim Jazz Orchestra.
 22 – Taylor Ho Bynum, American cornetist, flugelhornist, trumpeter, composer, educator, and writer.
 24 – Michael Magalon, Belgian bassist, guitarist, and composer.

 October
 2 – Kåre Opheim, Norwegian drumMer, Real Ones.
 12 – Espen Aalberg, Norwegian drummer.
 26 – Ole Marius Sandberg, Norwegian bassist.

 November
 26 – Arne Jansen, German guitarist, composer, and band leader.
 27 – Frode Nymo, Norwegian jazz musician (alto Saxophonist), Trondheim Jazz Orchestra and Urban Connection.

 December
 5 – Søren Bebe, Danish pianist and composer.

 Unknown date
 Jacob Anderskov, Danish pianist, composer and bandleader.
 Lionel Friedli, Swiss percussionist.
 Marcin Wasilewski, Polish pianist and composer.
 Matana Roberts, American sound experimentalist, visual artist, jazz saxophonist and clarinetist, and composer.
 Niki King, Scottish singer.
 Paul Harrison, English pianist, keyboarder, organist, and composer.

See also

 1970s in jazz
 List of years in jazz
 1975 in music

References

External links 
 History Of Jazz Timeline: 1975 at All About Jazz

Jazz
Jazz by year